Chipita S.A. is a Greek food company headquartered in Athens, Greece. As of 2016, it operates in 56 countries.

History
Chipita is a Greek snack food company established in 1973. In 1991, Chipita introduced one of its flagship products, the 7DAYS croissant—an individually packaged baked snack with long shelf life. Currently, Chipita products are manufactured in plants located in 11 different countries and arrketed to consumers in a total of 56 countries, either directly or through strategic partnerships.

The Group has 12 privately owned plants in the Netherlands, Greece, Germany, Bulgaria, Austria, United Kingdom, Poland, Russia, Romania, Turkey, Slovakia and Switzerland (2021). Additionally, six more plants operate through strategic partnerships in Saudi Arabia, Mexico, Malaysia and India. Since this period, Chipita has also set up commercial offices in 14 countries :he Netherlands, Austria, Czech Republic, Germany, Hungary, Switzerland, Serbia, Slovakia, Croatia, the Baltics, Georgia, Ukraine, Belarus and the United Kingdom. Chipita's goods, produced in 16 manufacturing plants in 11 different countries, are delivered to consumers in a total of 56 countries, either directly or indirectly through strategic partnerships.

Chipita employs more than 5,800 people from over 30 different nationalities. Approximately 4,700  of them are employed directly by Chipita and the rest through strategic partner companies.

In May 2021, Mondelēz International acquired Chipita for €2 billion. The transaction was completed on January 3, 2022.

Products

International brands 

7DAYS: Sweet and savory flour-based products

Products:
Sweet: 7DAYS Single Serve Croissant, 7DAYS mini croissants, 7DAYS Cakes, 7DAYS Biscuits 
Savory: Bake Rolls, Mini Bake Rolls, Fruit & Nuts, Pizzeti

Fineti: Chipita's confectionary range

Products: Fineti Chocolates, Fineti Dips & Sticks, Fineti Wafer Sticks, Fineti Spread

Chipicao: Targeted to children, Chipicao is a sweet snack brand whose products include a free insert, such as a sticker or a toy.

Products: Chipicao single serve croissants, Chipicao mini croissants, Chipicao biscuits, Chipicao Cakes.

Local Greek brands
Source:
Molto Croissants
SpinSpan Jam
Chipita and Tsipers potato chips
Extra extruded snacks: Extra Cheesy Curls, Extra Spicy Stars, Extra with Peanut

Joint venture partnerships 
Chipita S.A. has formed the following joint venture partnerships:

Mexico:

Established in 2017, CCP is a Joint Venture between Chipita, Catamo and Mr. Alberto Romo of Proan. CCP handles marketing, sales and distribution of mini croissants designed for kids under the brand Vuala.

India:

Britchip was set up in 2017 in India as a joint venture partnership between Chipita and Britannia Industries. Britchip office is based in Bangalore while its manufacturing plant is located in Pune. During the first months of 2019 it introduced croissant of cocoa and vanilla flavors in India under the brand name Treat.

Saudi Arabia: Modern Food Industries

Modern Food Industries (MFI) was set up in 2009 in Saudi Arabia as a joint venture between Chipita, Almarai and the Olayan Group. 

Modern Food Industries (MFI) is based in Riyadh and has manufacturing plants in Jeddah Al Kharj and Hail. In 2009 it introduced the 7DAYS croissant in Saudi Arabia. subsequently also entered the cakes market with its 7DAYS Swiss Rolls and 7DAYS Cake Bars, while in 2018 it launched 7Days Bake Rolls in the market. Modern Food Industries (MFI) is also present in the United Arab Emirates, Kuwait, Oman, Bahrain.

Malaysia: Muchico Bakery 

Established in 2016, Muchico Bakery SDN BHD is a joint venture in Malaysia between Chipita and the Tan Family.
Muchico Bakery commenced local manufacturing of the products and introduced the 7DAYS croissant as of 2017 in the market of Malaysia and as of 2018 in Singapore.

References

Sources

External links
 

Mondelez International
Food and drink companies of Greece
Food and drink companies established in 1973
Greek companies established in 1973
Companies based in Attica
Multinational companies headquartered in Greece
Greek brands
2021 mergers and acquisitions